Günter Tittes (born 23 October 1936) is a retired East German breaststroke swimmer. He competed at the 1960 Summer Olympics in the 4×100 m medley relay, but his team failed to reach the final. He won two national breaststroke titles in 1960 and 1961 and set a world record in the 100 m breaststroke in 1961.

References

1936 births
Living people
East German male breaststroke swimmers
Olympic swimmers of the United Team of Germany
Swimmers at the 1960 Summer Olympics
People from Greiz
Sportspeople from Thuringia